is a Japanese television drama series and the 103rd Asadora series, following Yell. It premiered on November 30, 2020 and concluded on May 15, 2021. It is based on the life of Chieko Naniwa.

Plot 
Chiyo Takei (Hana Sugisaki) was born to a poor family in Osaka Prefecture’s Minamikawachi district at the of the Meiji era. Her mother died when she was still a child, and she lived with her father Teruo and younger brother. Although Chiyo could not be put through elementary school, she has the gift of the gab and quick wit. At the age of 9, she starts working as a servant in Dotonbori and comes across the theatre world which immediately captivates her. Chiyo’s desire to become an actress grows stronger by the day. She eventually runs away and heads to Kyoto where she throws herself into acting.

Cast

Takei family 

 Hana Sugisaki as Chiyo Takei
 Nono Maida as young Chiyo
 Tortoise Matsumoto as Teruo Takei, Chiyo's father
 Emma Miyazawa as Kuriko Takei, Chiyo's step-mother
 Yūki Kura as Yoshiro Takei, Chiyo's younger brother
 Hinata Aruta as young Yoshio

Dotonbori people 

 Ryoko Shinohara as Shizu Okada, a landlady of Okayasu theater
 Jun Nagura as Sōsuke Okada, Shizu's husband
 Ayaka Higashino as Mitsue Okada, Shizu and Sōsuke's only daughter
 Yumi Kishida as young Mitsue
 Keiko Miyata as Hana Okada, Shizu's mother
 Yōko Ishino as Kiku Tomikawa, a landlady of Fukutomi theater
 Hideaki Okajima as Fukumatsu Tomikawa, Kiku's husband
 Takuya Inoue as Fukusuke Tomikawa, Kiku and Fukumatsu's only son
 Kazuma Matsumoto as young Fukusuke
 Kaoru Kusumi as Kame
 Shiori Doi as Fujiko
 Sawa Nimura as Setsuko
 Chisa Furuya as Tama
 Masumi Tange as Tsubaki
 Ren Sawaki as Hodan
 Kurumi Fujimoto as Ayame

Comedy people 

 Ryo Narita as Ippei Amami, Chiyo's husband
 Tōma Nakasu as young Ippei
 Motohiko Shigeyama as Tenkai Amami, Ippei's father
 Hidetoshi Hoshida as Sennosuke Suganoya
 Itsuji Itao as Mantarō Suganoya
 Tadashi Nishikawa as Kumada
 Haru Konishi as Tōko Asahina

Kamigata theater people 

 Nakamura Ganjirō IV as Ōyama Tsuruzō
 Haruka Igawa as Yuriko Takashiro, an actress
 Mayumi Wakamura as Chidori Yamamura
 Rio Asumi as Ruriko Takamine
 Kantarō Soganoya as Masanori Oyamada
 Eiji Kochō as Appare Suganoya
 Noriyuki Otsuka as Tokkuri Suganoya
 Ryotaro Okawa as Yōjirō Urushibara
 Kiyo Matsumoto as Kaori Ishida
 Ryutarō Sakaguchi as Hyakkuri Suganoya

People from Kyoto 

 Kazuhiko Nishimura as Kiyoshi Miyamoto, an owner of Kinema cafe
 Ai Yoshikawa as Mari Uno, a Kinema female employee
 Junko Abe as Yōko Wakasaki, an aspiring actress
 Emi Kurara as Kiyoko Yabuuchi, a member of "Chidori Yamamura Ichiza"

People in movie theater 

 Ryuya Wakaba as Shinji Kogure, an assistant director
 Seiji Rokkaku as Heihachi Katagane, the chief of Tsurukame studio
 Shibuya Tengai III as Moriya, a security guard
 Jun'ya Kawashima as George Honda, a director
 First Summer Uika as Mika Honda, an actress
 Akari Kizuki as Yayoi Tōyama, an actress

People from Kawachi 

 Koichi Kurokawa as Tatsuo Kobayashi
 Yoshikazu Kiuchi as Mr. Tamai
 Mitsuo Sagawa as Minegishi, president of a glass factory

Others 
 Muga Tsukaji as Ataro Hanaguruma
 Ōshirō Maeda as Kanji Matsushima
 Kichiya Katsura as Kurogo (also as narrator)

Production 
The filming began on April 2, 2020, but on April 7, NHK decided the suspension of shooting for the new series after Prime Minister Shinzo Abe proclaimed a one-month state of emergency for Tokyo and other prefectures. The shooting was resumed on June 24. Since then, it has been recorded in accordance with NHK "Drama Production Manual for Preventing New Coronavirus Infection", and although the recording schedule has been significantly delayed, it has not considered changing the script or shortening the broadcasting period. The series announced that it will premiered on November 30, after previously being delayed from original on September 28 due to the pandemic.

References

External links 
 Official website (in Japanese)

2020 Japanese television series debuts
2021 Japanese television series endings
Asadora
Television shows set in Osaka